Arthur Carter may refer to:

 Arthur L. Carter (born 1931), American investment banker, publisher, and artist
 Arthur Carter (politician) (1847–1917), businessman and Queensland politician